Kirk Alyn (born John Feggo Jr.; October 8, 1910 – March 14, 1999) was an American actor, best known for being the first actor to play the DC Comics character Superman in live-action for the 1948 movie serial Superman and its 1950 sequel Atom Man vs. Superman, as well as fellow DC Comics characters Blackhawk from the Blackhawk movie serial in 1952, and Lois Lane's father Sam Lane in 1978's Superman: The Movie.

Early life
Kirk Alyn was born as John Feggo Jr. on October 8, 1910, in Oxford, New Jersey, to Hungarian immigrant parents. In his youth he lived in Wharton, New Jersey. A plaque commemorating his life in the borough is hung in the municipal building, also signifying the small town's only point of interest.

Career
Alyn started as a chorus boy for Broadway plays, appearing in notable musicals such as Girl Crazy, Of Thee I Sing, and Hellzapoppin' during the 1930s.

He also worked as a singer and dancer in vaudeville before relocating to Hollywood during the early 1940s to act for feature movies, but he was successful only in gaining bit parts for low-budget movies before obtaining the role of Superman in 1948. During World War II, he served in the United States Navy.

Alyn also featured in movie serials, including Federal Agents Vs. Underworld Inc. (1948), Radar Patrol Vs. Spy King (1950) and Blackhawk (1952).

Alyn recalls the day producer Sam Katzman asked him to play Superman:

I thought it was a publicity stunt. I didn't think you could ever put Superman on film. They brought the people from D.C. Comics over and they said, 'Hey, he looks just like Clark Kent.' They said take off your shirt, so I did and flexed my muscles. Then the guy said, 'Take off your pants' and I said, 'Wait a minute.' I was 37 when I played Superman. I picked up that girl and ran up that flight of stairs like it was nothing."

Alyn played Superman for the first live-action Superman movie serial, released in 1948. The serial consisted of 15 episodes which recounted Superman’s arrival on Earth, getting a job as a reporter at the Daily Planet newspaper, and meeting Lois Lane and Jimmy Olsen.  The main plot consisted of Superman’s battle against the arch criminal the Spider Lady.

Two years later, Atom Man vs. Superman was released, featuring Lyle Talbot as Superman’s arch-villain Lex Luthor.  This serial also included a sequence involving an eerie alternate dimension, not unlike the Phantom Zone, which would not appear in the comics for another 11 years.

Alyn gave the Man of Steel a different portrayal to Clark Kent, adding to the element of disguise. This was in the tradition of radio's Superman, Bud Collyer. By contrast, his successor George Reeves played the dual roles more alike, as pointed out in Gary Grossman's book, Superman: Serial to Cereal. The character's flight was effected by having Alyn jump up, at which point he becomes represented by an animated character by way of rotoscoping, which flew away. Alyn had tried "flying" while suspended by hidden wires for the first serial but the wires turned out to be clearly visible and that footage was scrapped.)

After playing Superman, he again suffered casting problems. Apart from featuring in some similar comic book-type serials, he had few roles in television series and movies, some even uncredited, until he retired.

Alyn was reportedly offered the part of Superman for the television version of 1951, but refused it. In 1971, he published an autobiography entitled A Job for Superman.

Alyn shared a very brief cameo with his serial co-star, Noel Neill, as Sam and Ellen Lane, the parents of the young Lois Lane for the 1978 feature movie, Superman. In a brief on-set interview, he explains his method of portraying Superman and Clark Kent, contained in a documentary narrated by Ernie Anderson, The Making of Superman: The Movie (1978).

In 1981, Alyn appeared as "Pa Cant" in the parody movie Superbman: The Other Movie, a role that lasted only seconds, as Cant dies from heart failure immediately after discovering the strange visitor from the planet "Krapton".

Alyn made his final movie, the horror movie Scalps, in 1983.

In 1988, he participated in the 1988 TV special Superman 50th Anniversary Special as himself.  He also had a very brief appearance in a "Battlestar Galactica" episode.

Personal life
When he first went to Hollywood, Alyn met another performer, singer, dancer, and actress Virginia O'Brien. They were married in 1942, and had three children: daughters Terri O'Brien and Elizabeth Watkins and son John Feggo III. They were divorced in 1955.

Death
Alyn died on March 14, 1999, in The Woodlands, Texas, at the age of 88 from Alzheimer's disease. He was cremated. His ashes were scattered off the coast of California.

Honors
Alyn was the Grand Marshal of the Metropolis, Illinois Christmas parade and Annual Superman Celebrations several times. In 1985, DC Comics named Alyn as one of the honorees in the company's 50th anniversary publication Fifty Who Made DC Great.

Alyn received the Inkpot Award in 1974.

Filmography

References

Bibliography

External links

 
 

1910 births
1999 deaths
American male film actors
American male stage actors
Male film serial actors
Male actors from New Jersey
Vaudeville performers
People from Warren County, New Jersey
People from Morris County, New Jersey
American people of Hungarian descent
20th-century American male actors
Inkpot Award winners